María Ester Feres (14 February 1943 – 4 August 2021) was a Chilean politician and lawyer.

Biography
During the Popular Unity government, she advised the Workers' United Center of Chile. Following the 1973 Chilean coup d'état, she moved to Germany with her husband and two children. She then graduated from the Complutense University of Madrid and returned to Chile in 1986. Upon her return, she became a legal advisor for the Workers' United Center of Chile and the Comisión Nacional Campesina. In 1994, she was appointed Director General of the Dirección del Trabajo de Chile, serving until 2004, when she was forced to resign in the midst of widespread and ongoing strikes across the country. Following her exit from politics, she worked for the Central University of Chile.

María Ester Feres died on 4 August 2021, at the age of 78.

References

1943 births
2021 deaths
20th-century Chilean lawyers
Chilean women lawyers
Socialist Party of Chile politicians
Complutense University of Madrid alumni
University of Chile alumni
People from La Serena
21st-century Chilean lawyers